The Bure Valley Path is a  long walking trail and cycling trail in Norfolk, England. It runs alongside the Bure Valley Railway, a heritage railway from Wroxham to Aylsham.

Route 
The path passes through and close to following towns and villages.

 Aylsham
  Brampton
  Buxton
  Lamas
 Little Hautbois
 Great Hautbois
 Coltishall
 Hoveton
 Wroxham

External links 
Cycling on the Bure Valley path
The Bure Valley path

Footpaths in Norfolk